Sponsor is a genus of beetles in the family Buprestidae.  It belongs within the tribe Paratrachyini within the subfamily Polycestinae., and contains the following species:

 Sponsor aeneiventris Descarpentries, 1965
 Sponsor aeneolus Descarpentries, 1969
 Sponsor aeneus Guérin-Méneville, 1840
 Sponsor alluaudi Kerremans, 1894
 Sponsor ambiguus Lesne, 1937
 Sponsor androyensis Lesne, 1937
 Sponsor antamponensis Descarpentries, 1965
 Sponsor antanala Descarpentries, 1969
 Sponsor antelmei Lesne, 1918
 Sponsor anthracinus Descarpentries, 1965
 Sponsor antsihanaka Descarpentries, 1957
 Sponsor ater Descarpentries, 1965
 Sponsor auribasis Descarpentries, 1965
 Sponsor betsimisaraka Descarpentries, 1965
 Sponsor bicolor Descarpentries, 1965
 Sponsor burgeoni Théry in Lesne, 1937
 Sponsor caerulescens Guérin-Méneville, 1840
 Sponsor calo Descarpentries, 1965
 Sponsor carbonarius Théry, 1905
 Sponsor cariei Lesne, 1918
 Sponsor chalceus Descarpentries, 1965
 Sponsor chalybaeus Descarpentries, 1969
 Sponsor cobosi Bellamy, 1998
 Sponsor convexus Gory & Laporte, 1839
 Sponsor cupreoviolaceus Descarpentries, 1965
 Sponsor cupreoviridis Descarpentries, 1965
 Sponsor cupripennis Descarpentries, 1957
 Sponsor cyaneus Descarpentries, 1965
 Sponsor cyanipennis Descarpentries, 1965
 Sponsor deplanatus (Théry, 1905)
 Sponsor dermestoides Lesne, 1918
 Sponsor desjardinsii Guérin-Méneville, 1840
 Sponsor dissimilis Théry, 1931
 Sponsor distinctus Descarpentries, 1969
 Sponsor elegans Descarpentries, 1965
 Sponsor elongatus Descarpentries, 1965
 Sponsor emmaae Descarpentries, 1957
 Sponsor emmerezi Lesne, 1918
 Sponsor epicureus Descarpentries, 1965
 Sponsor epistomalis Descarpentries, 1957
 Sponsor fulgens Fairmaire, 1899
 Sponsor fusiformis Lesne, 1924
 Sponsor gagates Descarpentries, 1965
 Sponsor gemmatus Descarpentries, 1965
 Sponsor gianassoi Novak, 2002
 Sponsor grandis Lesne, 1937
 Sponsor granulicollis Descarpentries, 1965
 Sponsor gyrinoides Lesne, 1918
 Sponsor ignipennis Descarpentries, 1965
 Sponsor indicus Lesne, 1937
 Sponsor irideus Kerremans, 1902
 Sponsor janthinus (Fairmaire, 1886)
 Sponsor kerremansi (Théry, 1905)
 Sponsor lepidus Lesne, 1918
 Sponsor lesnei Théry, 1931
 Sponsor livens Descarpentries, 1965
 Sponsor macfadyeni Bellamy, 2004
 Sponsor malartici Lesne, 1922
 Sponsor mameti Descarpentries, 1957
 Sponsor mandraranus Lesne, 1924
 Sponsor marcsikae Holynski, 1997
 Sponsor melanopus Descarpentries, 1965
 Sponsor metallinus (Fairmaire, 1900)
 Sponsor mirabilis Descarpentries, 1969
 Sponsor montanus Descarpentries, 1969
 Sponsor monticola Descarpentries, 1969
 Sponsor montivagus Descarpentries, 1969
 Sponsor niger Descarpentries, 1969
 Sponsor nigricollis Descarpentries, 1965
 Sponsor nigroaeneus Descarpentries, 1965
 Sponsor nigrocyaneus Descarpentries, 1965
 Sponsor oblongus Kerremans, 1902
 Sponsor parilis Lesne, 1937
 Sponsor parvulus Guérin-Méneville, 1840
 Sponsor perrieri (Fairmaire, 1902)
 Sponsor pexipennis Lesne, 1937
 Sponsor peyrierasi Descarpentries, 1965
 Sponsor picea (Fisher, 1922)
 Sponsor pilosellus Kerremans, 1914
 Sponsor pinguis Guérin-Méneville, 1840
 Sponsor pseudelongatus Descarpentries, 1965
 Sponsor pseudepistomalis Descarpentries, 1965
 Sponsor pubescens Descarpentries, 1965
 Sponsor pulcher Lesne, 1937
 Sponsor pupa Lesne, 1924
 Sponsor purpureipennis Descarpentries, 1965
 Sponsor pygmaeus Lesne, 1922
 Sponsor raffrayi Théry, 1931
 Sponsor reunionensis Descarpentries, 1957
 Sponsor rodriganus Lesne, 1918
 Sponsor rufipes Descarpentries, 1965
 Sponsor rufitarsis Lesne, 1918
 Sponsor rutilans Descarpentries, 1965
 Sponsor satanas Descarpentries, 1965
 Sponsor semistrigosus (Fairmaire, 1902)
 Sponsor senescens Descarpentries, 1969
 Sponsor senilis Descarpentries, 1965
 Sponsor sericeus (Kerremans, 1894)
 Sponsor setosulus Lesne, 1937
 Sponsor seyrigi Descarpentries, 1957
 Sponsor similis Descarpentries, 1965
 Sponsor somaliensis Holm & Wentzel, 1991
 Sponsor splendens Guérin-Méneville, 1840
 Sponsor subparallelus Lesne, 1918
 Sponsor succinicola Descarpentries, 1969
 Sponsor theryi Lesne, 1937
 Sponsor tristis Descarpentries, 1965
 Sponsor vadoni Lesne, 1937
 Sponsor vadonianus Descarpentries, 1957
 Sponsor vetustus Descarpentries, 1965
 Sponsor viduus Descarpentries, 1969
 Sponsor viettei Descarpentries, 1965
 Sponsor vieui Descarpentries, 1965
 Sponsor villosus Lesne, 1922
 Sponsor vinsoni Lesne, 1937
 Sponsor violaceipennis Descarpentries, 1969
 Sponsor violaceus (Fairmaire, 1903)
 Sponsor viridiaenus Descarpentries, 1969
 Sponsor viridiauratus Descarpentries, 1965
 Sponsor viridicoerulans Descarpentries, 1965

References

Buprestidae genera